The Speaker of the Legislative Assembly of British Columbia is the presiding officer of the Legislative Assembly of British Columbia.

The office of Speaker in British Columbia

The Speaker is elected by the Members of the Legislative Assembly ("MLAs") by means of a secret ballot at the commencement of a new parliament, or on the death or retirement of the previous Speaker. Cabinet Ministers are the only MLAs not entitled to stand for election as Speaker.  The business of the Legislative Assembly cannot continue without a Speaker. Under British Columbia's parliamentary tradition, the Lieutenant Governor of British Columbia will not open Parliament until a Speaker is elected.

Prior practice had been for the Premier to select the Speaker and have that selection ratified by a vote of the legislative assembly. The Legislative Assembly also appoints a Deputy Speaker, who presides in the absence of the Speaker. During the 38th Parliament, which was elected in the BC general election held on May 17, 2005, the position of Assistant Deputy Speaker was created. This office is usually held by an MLA who represents the official opposition party.

Traditionally, the Speaker has been a member of the governing party, though Speaker Darryl Plecas was an exception from 2017-2020; however, while holding the office of Speaker that MLA must act neutrally and treat all other MLAs impartially, and to preserve this impartiality the Speaker follows Speaker Denison's rule in breaking ties. The Speaker presides over the debates and procedures of the Legislative Assembly. The Speaker enforces the Rules of Procedure, commonly referred to as the Standing Orders. Any disputes or procedural rulings are made according to the Standing Orders or, in absence of a rule governing a specific situation, to parliamentary precedence and convention. The Speaker does not vote, except in the case of a tie.

Until the early 1990s, the traditional form of address and reference to the Speaker was "Mr. Speaker". Today, the office holder is now referred to as simply the "Speaker", but during debates the MLAs may continue to address the office holder as "Mr. Speaker" or "Madam Speaker". In accordance with parliamentary tradition, all speeches are addressed to the Speaker, and not the other MLAs.

The Speaker is responsible for the legislative precincts, including the Parliament Buildings. The Speaker also sponsors the British Columbia Legislative Internship Program. In addition to his or her duties as Speaker, the Speaker continues to represent the voters of his or her constituency as an Members of the Legislative Assembly. The channel televised proceedings is Hansard TV.

Speakers of the Legislative Assembly of British Columbia

See also
 Speaker of the House of Commons (Canada)

Notes

References

External links
Welcome Message from The Speaker (from the Legislative Assembly of British Columbia website).

British Columbia

Speak